Walter Clyde "Puggy" Pearson (January 29, 1929 – April 12, 2006) was an American professional poker player. He is best known as the 1973 World Series of Poker Main Event winner.

Early years
Pearson was born and raised in Tennessee in a family with nine siblings. He got his nickname "Puggy" from a childhood accident that left him with a disfigured nose at the age of twelve. He dropped out of school in the fifth grade, and at the age of 17, he joined the United States Navy, where he served three terms. He strengthened his skills at poker and gambling while in the Navy.

Professional poker
Prior to 1949, all poker games were cash games; a player could cash out his chips and leave at any time. Pearson originated the idea of a freezeout tournament and shared his idea with fellow gambler "Nick the Greek" Dandolos in the early 1950s. Dandalos later brought the idea to legendary casino owner Benny Binion. After further urging by Pearson, Amarillo Slim, and Doyle Brunson, all of whom felt that such a tournament would create great side (cash) game action, Binion founded the World Series of Poker in 1970. Pearson participated in the first World Series of Poker that year along with Amarillo Slim, Doyle Brunson, Sailor Roberts, Crandell Addington, and Carl Cannon.

Pearson won his first World Series of Poker (WSOP) bracelet in the 1971 Limit Seven-Card Stud preliminary event. In 1973, he won two preliminary events in the WSOP. In the same World Series, he won the Main Event when his A♠ 7♠ defeated Johnny Moss's  J♠. With the Main Event victory, he became the first player in WSOP history to win three events in a single year. This record has since been matched by five others. He won four bracelets, two of which were in seven-card stud and two of which were No limit hold'em.

Pearson was known as a man who would always seek out the biggest game in town, whether it was in the poker room or on the golf course. He owned a RV, which he called the Roving Gambler, with this painted on the side: "I'll play any man from any land any game he can name for any amount I can count, provided I like it."

Pearson was inducted into the Poker Hall of Fame in 1987.

He was also infamously abusive to casino employees, throwing cards at dealers, berating floor persons and not tipping service staff.

World Series of Poker Bracelets

Death
Pearson, who had a long history of heart problems, died on April 12, 2006.

Notes

External links
Guardian article by Victoria Coren
CardPlayer article by Jeff Shulman
Hendon Mob tournament results
WNY Poker thread

1929 births
2006 deaths
American gin players
American poker players
United States Navy sailors
World Series of Poker Main Event winners
World Series of Poker bracelet winners
Super Bowl of Poker event winners
People from Tennessee
People from the Las Vegas Valley
Poker Hall of Fame inductees